The following is a list of hotels located on the Las Vegas Strip.

List of hotels

See also

 Lists of hotels

References

External links
 Map of Las Vegas Hotels

Las Vegas Strip
Lists of hotels by city
Hotels
Hotels